NIFA may refer to:

National Intercollegiate Flying Association
Nuclear Institute for Food and Agriculture
National Institute of Food and Agriculture
National Islamic Front of Afghanistan